Ölberg is German for "oil hill" and may refer to:

Hills:
 Großer Ölberg, a hill in the Siebengebirge, Germany
 Ölberg (Görlitz), a hill on the Görlitz Holy Tomb site, Germany
 Ölberg (Nuremberg), the site of Nuremberg Castle, Germany
 German name for the Mount of Olives, east of Jerusalem's old town

Places:
 Ölberg (Rottenbuch), village in the municipality of Rottenbuch, county of Weilheim-Schongau, Bavaria, Germany
 Ölberg (Schöllnach), village in the market municipality of Schöllnach, county of Deggendorf, Bavaria, Germany

 Ölberg (Wuppertal) ciudad Renania del norte
 Ölberg (Innsbruck), place in Innsbruck, Austria